( unlisted on March 26, 2008) is a Japanese department store. Based in Shinjuku, Tokyo, Isetan has branches throughout Japan and South East Asia, including in Jinan, Kuala Lumpur, Selangor, Shanghai, Singapore and Tianjin, and formerly in Bangkok, Hong Kong, Kaohsiung, London, and Vienna.

On April 1, 2008, Isetan and Mitsukoshi were merged under a joint holding company called Isetan Mitsukoshi Holdings Ltd..

Branches in Japan

Directly owned

 Shinjuku flagship store

The Isetan flagship store in Shinjuku is considered to be one of the most influential department stores in Japan. The store is often first with showcasing new trends and new products. In particular, the fashion and food floors are thought to be very trendsetting.

Behind the main store, there is a whole building dedicated to Men's Fashion ("Men's Isetan")
 Tachikawa
 Urawa-ku, Saitama

Subsidiaries
 Niigata Isetan (Chūō-ku, Niigata, operated by Niigata Isetan Mitsukoshi, Ltd.)
 Shizuoka Isetan (Aoi-ku, Shizuoka, operated by Shizuoka Isetan, Ltd.)
 West Japan Railway Isetan Ltd.
 JR Kyoto Isetan (west side of JR West Kyoto Station Building, Shimogyō-ku, Kyoto)
 JR Osaka Isetan Mitsukoshi (JR West Osaka Station North Gate Building, Kita-ku, Osaka)
 Iwataya (Tenjin, Chuo-ku, Fukuoka, operated by Iwataya Mitsukoshi Ltd.)
 HaMaYa Department Store (Nagasaki)

Closed branches

 Kichijoji
  Hachiōji
 Fuchū
 Sagamihara
 Matsudo
 Kokura Isetan

Branches outside Japan

Branches in Southeast Asia
  Kuala Lumpur - (Suria KLCC, The Gardens at Mid Valley City, Lot 10 (as ISETAN The Japan Store)), Selangor - Mitsui Outlet Park KLIA (as Isetan Outlet Store))
 
  (Shaw House and Centre, NEX and Tampines Mall)

Isetan previously opened at Orchard's Wisma Atria, a neighboring shopping mall to Isetan Scotts branch, but closed in March 2015, and converted for rental purposes. Currently the space, leased to Isetan, was filled with Mango, iora, Salon Vim, DRx Medical Aesthetic Clinic, YANN VEYRIE SALON, Franck Muller, Gautier Stylish French Living, Longines, World of Watches, UCHINO MYMY, SCANTEAK, and Sony.

Several stores were closed down due to COVID-19 pandemic. These include Westgate, of which it was closed down on 8 March 2020, followed by CentralWorld store at Bangkok while restaurant zone and Kinokuniya Bookstores will still remain., and the closure of Parkway Parade branch on 31 January 2022., and also the upcoming closure of 1 Utama Branch. Also the Japan Food Town, the cluster of Japanese restaurants on the fourth floor of what previously known as Isetan Wisma Atria was shuttered. Prior to closure, some tenants were already moved out. Isetan has already received offers from external parties interested to lease its space.

Branches in China
 Shanghai
 Tianjin
 Chengdu

Closed Branches outside Japan

  Barcelona, Closed down in August 1993.
  Tsim Sha Tsui, Opened in May 1973. Closed down on 1996.
  London, Opened in August 1989. Closed down in December 2000.
  Vienna, Opened in April 1990. Closed down in August 2003.
  Kaohsiung, Opened in November 1992. Closed down in March 2008.
  Westgate, Opened on 2013. Closed down on March 8, 2020.
  Bangkok (CentralWorld), Opened on April 8, 1992. Closed down on August 31, 2020.
  Parkway Parade, Opened on 1983. Closed down on January 31, 2022.
  Petaling Jaya (1 Utama), Opened on November 2011. Closed down on April 5, 2022.

References

External links
 ISETAN GROUP 
 Foreign Customer Service - English
 Isetan Singapore
 Isetan Malaysia

Department stores of Japan
Department stores of Malaysia
Department stores of Singapore
Defunct department stores of Thailand
Retail companies established in 1886
Retail companies disestablished in 2011
Japanese brands
Companies formerly listed on the Tokyo Stock Exchange
2008 mergers and acquisitions